Balsam woolly adelgids (Adelges piceae) are small wingless insects that infest and kill firs, especially balsam fir and Fraser fir. They are an invasive species from Europe introduced to the United States around 1900.

Because this species is not native to the United States, the Fraser fir has not evolved any type of defense against it.

Reproduction
These insects typically lay about one hundred eggs and have three generations per year. The adelgid attacks the tree by feeding in fissures within the bark of trees larger than about four centimeters in diameter at breast height. As it feeds, it releases toxins contained within its saliva. These toxins reduce the conductance of sapwood being built, which causes water stress and kills the trees.

Impact
The Great Smoky Mountains National Park, straddling North Carolina and Tennessee in the  Southeastern United States, contains about 75% of all southern spruce-fir ecosystems. These ecosystems covered vast portions of the Southeast during the last ice age, when the climate was cool and moist. Since the retreat of the glaciers, this ecosystem has been confined to the higher elevations in the mountains of the Southeast. The spruce-fir forest has evolved as an island, away from any other ecosystems of its type. This has presented valuable research and a unique habitat. These forests have a very dense canopy and a moist understory.

Since the invasion of the balsam woolly adelgid, discovered in 1957, Fraser fir mortality rates have been 90–99%. Although some areas are being regenerated by young firs, there is much change in understory composition, including invasion by both woody and herbaceous species. Red Spruce, the spruce component of the spruce fir ecosystem, has also been suffering declines. Some researchers attribute these declines to damage from wind, which is usually blocked by the firs. Balsam woolly adelgids destroyed about 95% of the Fraser firs in the Great Smoky Mountains National Park, creating "ghost forests". The number of adult firs relative to young firs has increased over 30 years, with Clingmans Dome having three times as many adult trees as of 2020 as in the 1980s. 

One concern is that acid rain and the deterioration of the ozone, among other pollutants, are contributing to a weak immune system for the Fraser firs and making them more susceptible to the balsam woolly adelgids. The Spruce-fir moss spider, which lives on moss mats below the forest canopy, is considered endangered due to the decline of the Fraser fir.

The Balsam woolly adelgid also has a significant impact on Pacific Northwest forests. Specifically, grand fir, silver fir and subalpine fir in Washington and Oregon all can serve as a host. Extensive mortality due to this pest in the Cascade Mountain range was recorded during the 1950s and 1960s. Land area affected by the adelgid in the Pacific Northwest has increased from 83,325 acres (337 km2) in 2004 to 108,128 acres (438 km2) in 2005.

References

Adelgidae
Insect pests of temperate forests
Hemiptera of Europe
Insects of the United States
Insects described in 1844
Taxa named by Julius Theodor Christian Ratzeburg